Freccia was the name of at least three ships of the Italian Navy and may refer to:

 , a  launched in 1899 and lost in 1911.
 , a  launched in 1930 and sunk in 1943.
 , a patrol boat launched in 1965 and retired in 1984.

Italian Navy ship names